Hartagyugh is a town in the Lori Province of Armenia. The village was founded in 1820 by Western Armenian immigrants. The ancestors of the inhabitants came from Basen, Mush, Erzurum, Alashkert, Van and Kars. The settlement has existed since the 4th millennium BC.

History 
During the 1920 Turkish–Armenian war, the village (known then as Ghaltakhchi) was occupied by Turkish forces and 2,100 of its inhabitants were massacred.

Demographics 
The population of the village since 1831 is as follows:

References 

 
 World Gazeteer: Armenia – World-Gazetteer.com

Populated places in Lori Province